The Singapore men's national floorball team is the national floorball team of the Singapore and is organized by the Singapore Floorball Association.

First organized in 1996, the national team is the first Asian nation to participate at the World Floorball Championships having participated in the inaugural edition of the tournament which was held in Sweden in 1996.
They are the winner of 2019 Asia-Oceania Floorball Cup and of men's floorball tournament in 2015 Southeast Asian Floorball Championships.

Records

World Floorball Championships

Asia-Oceania Floorball Cup

Southeast Asian Games

Southeast Asian Floorball Championships

References

Singapore
Floorball